Lloyd McGrath (born 24 February 1965) is an English retired professional footballer.

A hard-working midfielder, McGrath made his senior debut for Coventry City on 28 April 1984 in one of their heaviest defeats ever - an 8-2 Football League First Division defeat at Southampton. However, three years later he took part in the biggest success of their history so far - the 1987 FA Cup Final triumph over Tottenham Hotspur. He set up the winning goal with a cross that was deflected off the knee of Gary Mabbutt.

By the time of his departure to Portsmouth at the end of the 1993-94 season, when the Sky Blues finished 11th in the FA Premier League, he had played 214 league games for the club and scored four goals.

He played for Pompey for the rest of his professional career, retiring in 1997. He now has business interests in the north of Coventry as licensee of the Hawkesmill Social Club.

References

External links

1965 births
Living people
Footballers from Birmingham, West Midlands
English footballers
Coventry City F.C. players
Portsmouth F.C. players
English Football League players
Premier League players
England under-21 international footballers
Sing Tao SC players
Association football midfielders
FA Cup Final players